Simulcast is the sixth studio album by American musician  Tycho. It was released on February 28, 2020 under Mom + Pop Music and Ninja Tune.

Recording 
Simulcast reworks the vocal tracks from Tycho’s previous album Weather. The vocals were removed and the instrumentation was expanded upon.

Critical reception
Simulcast was met with generally favorable reviews from critics. At Metacritic, which assigns a weighted average rating out of 100 to reviews from mainstream publications, this release received an average score of 67, based on 4 reviews.

Track listing

Charts

References

2020 albums
Tycho (musician) albums
Mom + Pop Music albums